The 1998 PGA Championship was the 80th PGA Championship, held August 13–16 at Sahalee Country Club in Redmond, Washington, a suburb east of Seattle. Vijay Singh won the first of his three major championships, two strokes ahead of runner-up Steve Stricker.

This was only the tenth time the championship was played in the western half of the United States;  the next was 22 years later at TPC Harding Park in San Francisco. It was the third major championship held in the Pacific Northwest, all PGA Championships. The previous two were match play events, held in Spokane in 1944 and Portland in 1946.

Sahalee was scheduled to host again in 2010, but the PGA of America reversed its decision in early 2005 and moved it to Whistling Straits in Wisconsin.

Course layout

South and North nines

Round summaries

First round
Thursday, August 13, 1998

Second round
Friday, August 14, 1998

Third round
Saturday, August 15, 1998

Final round
Sunday, August 16, 1998

As 54-hole co-leaders at 203 (−7), Vijay Singh and Steve Stricker were in the final pairing at noon PDT, four shots ahead of the field. Stricker stayed within a stroke until the par-3 17th, where both tee shots found the same bunker. Singh saved par but Stricker couldn't, and both parred 18; Singh shot 68 (−2) to win his first major by two strokes. Steve Elkington, the 1995 champion, carded a 67 to finish in solo third, a stroke behind Stricker. Nick Price, the champion in 1992 and 1994, shot a bogey-free 65 to equal the course record.

Source:

Scorecard
Final round

Cumulative tournament scores, relative to par

Source:

References

External links
Full results
PGA.com – 1998 PGA Championship

PGA Championship
Golf in Washington (state)
Redmond, Washington
PGA Championship
PGA Championship
PGA Championship
PGA Championship